Rosa donetzica is a species of rose in the family Rosaceae, native to Ukraine and south European Russia, generally near the eastern Black Sea. It is a rare endemic typically found growing in rocky areas, and is decreasing in abundance due to pressure from grazing and stone quarrying.

References

donetzica
Flora of Ukraine
Flora of South European Russia
Plants described in 1966